Danuta Lato (born Danuta Irzyk; 25 November 1963) is a Polish glamour model, actress and later singer.

Career

Lato was born Danuta Irzyk on 25 November 1963 (some sources giving the year 1965 instead of 1963) in the small village of Szufnarowa in Gmina Wiśniowa, Podkarpackie Voivodeship where she later worked as a kindergarten teacher. She married and divorced her first husband at the age of 20 after only a week's marriage. It was the first divorce ever in the village. Some sources claim her daughter Laura is from that weeklong marriage.

Lato moved to West Germany in 1984 to pursue a modeling and film career, including a recurring role in Yehuda Barkan's series of Hidden Camera films.

Throughout the late 1980s into the 1990s she pursued a music career. As a singer, she had moderate success in Europe with her single "Touch My Heart". Her other songs were syndicated across European Italo disco compilation CDs from the 1980s–1990s, such as Hot Girls.

Although not officially retired, she has not been in the public eye since 1994.

Discography
Singles
 1987 – Touch My Heart / I Need You (ZYX)
 1989 – Whenever You Go / Nobody's Woman (ZYX)

Compilation
 1989 – "Hot Girls" (with Samantha Fox and Sabrina) (Perfil)

Filmography

References

External links
 
 

1963 births
English-language singers from Poland
Polish film actresses
Polish actresses
Polish expatriates in Germany
Eurodisco musicians
Glamour models
Living people